Oru Mugathirai is a 2017 Indian Tamil-language drama film written and directed by R. Senthil Nadan. Starring Rahman, Suresh and Aditi Gururaj, the film's score and soundtrack is composed by Prem Kumar. The film began production during July 2015 and was released on 17 March 2017. The film was dubbed and released in Telugu as Dr. Sathyamurthy in 2018.

Cast
 Rahman as Sathyamoorthy Rathnavel (Rohit)
 Suresh as Arjun
 Aditi Gururaj as Kanmani
 Devika Madhavan
 Delhi Ganesh
 Meera Krishnan
 Swaminathan
 Chaams
 Pandu
 Sai Prashanth as Kishore
 Rekha Suresh

Production
The film began production in July 2015 and marked the return of director R. Senthil Nadan, who had previously made the horror film Sivi (2007). Senthilnadan had launched the film titled FB with tagline Statushae Podu Chat Pannu, but later changed the title to Oru Mugathirai. Described as a psychological thriller based on Facebook, Rahman was signed to portray the lead role of a psychiatrist, while newcomer Suresh and Aditi Gururaj were also cast in the film. Aditi had initially refused the film, though Senthil Nadan managed to convince her to agree terms after six months. The film was shot in 42 days in and around Goa, Puducherry and Ooty, with music composed by Prem Kumar, an associate of A. R. Rahman, while Saravanapandian, handled the camera work. Senthil Nadan worked on the project simultaneously alongside his commitments for a horror film titled Raja Magal.

The success of Dhuruvangal Pathinaaru (2016) starring Rahman prompted producers of his delayed ventures to publicise and release their films to make most of the actor's renaissance at the box office. Subsequently, after the release of Pagadi Aattam in February 2017, Oru Mugathirai was prepared for a March 2017 release. Furthermore, the success of Dhuruvangal Pathinaaru'''s Telugu version, D16, meant that distributor D. Venkatesh also purchased Telugu dubbing rights for the film in March 2017. Similar to his lack of promotional activity for Pagadi Aattam, Rahman opted not to promote the film. For the film's release in Malaysia, it was agreed that profits from the film would go towards financing Tamil schools in the country.

Soundtrack

The film's music was composed by Premkumar Sivaperuman, while the audio rights of the film was acquired by Times Music India. The album released on 19 August 2016 and featured five songs.

Release
The film opened on 17 March 2017 to negative reviews, with the critic from The Times of India giving the film a negative review and stating "the theatrical nature of the performances, and the clumsy filmmaking drains the tension from the scenes". The critic further added "you can only sympathise with Rahman, whose career seemed to have taken an upturn with Dhuruvangal Pathinaaru (2016). For now, that film's success has resulted in two of his sub-standard previous outings (Oru Mugathirai and Pagadi Aattam'') getting a release and taking things back to square one".

References

External links
 

2017 films
2010s Tamil-language films
Films set in Chennai
Films shot in Chennai
Films shot in Goa
Films shot in Puducherry
Indian thriller films
2017 thriller films